Pterygostemon is a genus of flowering plants belonging to the family Brassicaceae.

Its native range is Central Asia to Xinjiang.

Species:
 Pterygostemon spathulatus (Kar. & Kir.) V.V.Botschantz.

References

Brassicaceae
Brassicaceae genera